Sevenia, commonly called tree nymphs, is a genus of forest butterflies in the family Nymphalidae that, as larvae, feed on plants of the family Euphorbiaceae. There are fourteen species from continental Africa and two (or three) species from Madagascar. See Idea for the genus of Southeast Asian tree nymphs.

Taxonomy
Sevenia (as Sallya) has been viewed as a subgenus of the Neotropical genus Eunica by authors. The type species of the genus is Crenis madagascariensis Boisduval

Species and subspecies
Listed alphabetically:
 
Sevenia amazoula (Mabille, 1880) 
Sevenia amulia (Cramer, 1777)
Sevenia amulia amulia (Cramer, 1777) (= Papilio amulia Cramer, 1777)
Sevenia amulia rosa (Hewitson, 1877)
Sevenia amulia intermedia Carcasson, 1961
Sevenia benguelae (Chapman, 1872)
Sevenia boisduvali (Wallengren, 1857) (= Crenis boisduvali Wallengren, 1857) – Boisduval's tree nymph
Sevenia boisduvali boisduvali (Wallengren, 1857)
Sevenia boisduvali omissa (Rothschild, 1918)
Sevenia boisduvali kaffana (Rothschild & Jordan)
Sevenia boisduvali insularis (Joicey & Talbot) 
Sevenia consors (Rothschild & Jordan, 1903)
Sevenia dubiosa (Strand, 1911)
Sevenia garega (Karsch, 1892)
Sevenia garega garega (Karsch, 1892)
Sevenia garega ansorgei (Rothschild & Jordan, 1903)
Sevenia howensis (Staudinger, 1886)
Sevenia madagascariensis (Boisduval, 1833) (= Crenis madagascariensis Boisduval, 1833)
Sevenia morantii (Trimen, 1881) (= Crenis morantii Trimen, 1881) – Morant's tree nymph
Sevenia morantii morantii (Trimen, 1881)
Sevenia morantii dubiosa (Strand)
Sevenia natalensis (Boisduval, 1847) (= Crenis natalensis Boisduval, 1847) – Natal tree nymph
Sevenia occidentalium (Mabille, 1876)
Sevenia occidentalium occidentalium (Mabille, 1876)
Sevenia occidentalium penricei (Rothschild & Jordan)
Sevenia pechueli (Dewitz, 1879)
Sevenia pechueli pechueli (Dewitz, 1879)
Sevenia pechueli rhodesiana (Rothschild)
Sevenia pseudotrimeni Kielland, 1985
Sevenia rosa (Hewitson, 1877) – Rosa's tree nymph 
Sevenia silvicola (Schultze, 1917)
Sevenia trimeni (Aurivillius, 1899) (= Crenis natalensis var. trimeni Aurivillius, 1899) – Trimen's tree nymph
Sevenia trimeni trimeni (Aurivillius, 1899)
Sevenia trimeni major (Rothschild) 
Sevenia umbrina (Karsch, 1892)

References

External links

Sallya at Markku Savela's Lepidoptera and Some Other Life Forms (Sallya is a synonym of Sevenia)
Seitz, A. Die Gross-Schmetterlinge der Erde 13: Die Afrikanischen Tagfalter. Plate XIII 49 et prae

 
Nymphalidae genera
Biblidinae